Ridiculusmus is a British theatre company founded in 1992 by Angus Barr, Jon Haynes and David Woods. Their work has been described as "seriously funny," "Dadaist" and "physical theatre." Theatre critic Ian Shuttleworth said that Ridiculusmus is "not so much rough theatre as completely dishevelled." Since 1996, the company has been led by Haynes and Woods as co-directors, and although the majority of their stage works in recent years have been two-handers, they additionally work with a large pool of collaborators.

Their first few productions were adaptations of novels, but, apart from a two-man version of The Importance of Being Earnest, produced in 2005, since 1997 Haynes and Woods have devised and written all Ridiculusmus' plays. Some of these have been published by Oberon Books and commissioned by the Barbican, London.

Early years 

The founding members met as students at London's Poor School and while there they began busking on the London underground and doing comedy club open spots. They called themselves Mel, Pat & Harm, and performed comic songs from the 1920s and 1930s to the accompaniment of Barr's ukulele. They also opened a Dadaist comedy club called The Tomato Club above a couscous restaurant in Kentish Town. The highlight of the evening was the "tomato spot," in which comics were invited to perform deliberately bad material to an audience armed with over-ripe tomatoes. The listing in Time Out said "Don't come," to which the magazine added "probably advice worth taking."

On graduating from The Poor School, Ridiculusmus filled a cancelled slot at London's Canal Cafe Theatre with a hastily produced adaptation of Jerome K. Jerome's Three Men in a Boat. It played to mixed reviews and encouraged the troupe to produce more adaptations; their next production was a promenade version of Flann O'Brien's cult classic novel The Third Policeman. Opening at Aras na Gael, the show, with free pints of The Wrastler stout given to any audience member bringing a bicycle part, became an instant small scale hit. Adding fellow Poor School graduates Kevin Henshall and Lucy Cuthbertson, the company grew to five members.  Finding it difficult to survive in London, Ridiculusmus began to tour, and jumped at an offer to be in residence at The Playhouse in Derry, Northern Ireland. A trio once again—Woods and Haynes adapted another O'Brien novel, At Swim-Two-Birds, which toured widely.

The Sister Mary Sessions 

In 1996 Ridiculusmus broke away from the adaptation of novels and began writing and producing their own work. The development season in the Sister Mary room at the playhouse in Derry resulted in three self-authored pieces, School, The Exhibitionists and Christmas.

The Exhibitionists went on to tour nationally and internationally over the next six years.

ARSEFLOP 

In 1999 Woods and Haynes coined the acrostic mnemonic ARSEFLOP to articulate their working principles: Attitude, Reality, Sensitivity, Edge, Focus, Listen, Open Your Heart and Play.

Later works 

Ridiculusmus has created seven more main stage works in the last 15 years: Say Nothing; Ideas Men; Tough Time, Nice Time; Total Football;  The World Mouse Plague; The Eradication of Schizophrenia in Western Lapland and Give Me Your Love.

Awards 
 Winners Total Theatre Significant Contribution Award (2014)
 Nominated for International Melbourne Comedy Festival Barry (2002 & 2004)
 Winners Time Out Live Award (2001)
Nominated for Adelaide Fringe Award (2000)
Winners Total Theatre Award for Best British Productions (1999)
Winners Herald Angel Award for Innovation (1999)
Nominated for Granada Media Comedy Writing Award (1999)

Funding 

The group, who had been project grant recipients, were up until the end of March 2015 a National portfolio organisation of the Arts Council of England. They have received project funding from many prestigious sources such as the National Lottery through Arts Council England; the Wellcome Trust; Royal Victoria Hall Foundation; the Australian Government through the Australia Council for the Arts; Victorian College of the Arts, Melbourne University and the City of Melbourne through Arts House and its Culture Lab programme.

List of Works

External links 
Ridiculusmus on Twitter

References 

Theatre companies in London
Theatre companies in England
Theatre companies in Northern Ireland
Touring theatre